Railway Line 191 is a single-track, electrified railway line running only in Silesian Voivodeship, and as such serving as the main railway artery between Goleszów and Wisła in Poland.

History 

The line connecting Goleszów and the steelworks in Ustroń was established in 1888 and belonged to Railways of Silesian and Galician Cities. Subsequent sections were built after World War I in the reborn Second Polish Republic - on 15th of March 1928, the section Ustroń - Polana (6.76 km long) was opened, on 10th of July 1929 Polana - Wisła (now Wisła Uzdrowisko, length 2.74 km) and on 11th of September 1933 Wisła - Wisła Głębce (5.2 km long). On the latter, the company of engineer Ksawery Goryanowicz in the years 1931 - 1933 built a seven-span concrete railway viaduct with a length of 122 meters and a maximum height of pillars of 25 meters. The line was to be extended to Zwardoń (via Koniaków), but the outbreak of World War II prevented the implementation of these plans.

After World War II, due to the destruction of the bridge over the Vistula River by the retreating German army, until 28th of May 1946, traffic on the line was carried out only to the stop in Obłaźec. The line was fully electrified in 1974 (in December 1974, the 5,000th kilometer of electrified lines in Poland was handed over).

Revitalization 

From March 2021 to November 2022, a comprehensive revitalization of the line was carried out. two new railway stations: Ustroń Brzegi and Wisła Jawornik, was opened on 11th of December 2022.

Stations on the route

References 

Railway lines in Poland